Kepler-174 is a K-type main-sequence star located in the Milky Way galaxy at a distance of about  away from the Sun. It is located inside the boundaries of the Lyra constellation, but it is too dim to be visible to the unaided eye and is not part of the main outline.

Planetary system
Kepler-174 has three confirmed super-Earth planets orbiting it, Kepler-174b, Kepler-174c and Kepler-174d, discovered by the Kepler space telescope using the transit method. The discovery of all three planets was announced in 2014 by a team led by Jason F. Rowe, as part of a study validating hundreds of Kepler planets. Kepler-174d is notable as it is within the star's habitable zone, meaning it is potentially habitable.

In popular culture
The planet Kepler-174d is mentioned in the Star Trek: Discovery episode, Terra Firma, Part 1. in which it is inhabited and is referred to as "quite beautiful".

References

 
Lyra (constellation)
K-type main-sequence stars
Planetary systems with three confirmed planets
0518
J19094540+4349555
158434144